Prestige Bulletin is a financial journal published monthly in South Africa since 1989.

It covers investments, financial markets, personal finance, tax planning and entrepreneurship. Prestige Bulletin aims to be objective and does not promote specific investment products or accept advertising.

References

External links
 Official website

1989 establishments in South Africa
Business magazines
Financial markets
Magazines established in 1989
Monthly magazines published in South Africa
Personal finance
Professional and trade magazines
Stock market
Magazines published in South Africa
English-language magazines published in South Africa